Vatica guangxiensis is a species of plant in the family Dipterocarpaceae endemic to China.

References

Further reading
Li, Qiaoming, Zaifu Xu, and Tianhua He. "Ex situ genetic conservation of endangered Vatica guangxiensis(Dipterocarpaceae) in China." Biological Conservation 106.2 (2002): 151–156.
QM, Li, and Xu ZF. "Genetic diversity and population differentiation of Vatica guangxiensis." Acta Bo (2001): 201–208.
Li, Qiao-Ming, and Zai-Fu Xu. "Genetic Diversity and Population Differentiation of Vatica guangxiensis." Acta Botanica Yunnanica 23.2 (2001): 201–208.

guangxiensis
Endemic flora of China
Flora of Guangxi
Trees of China
Critically endangered flora of Asia
Taxonomy articles created by Polbot